Leslie Klein (born December 20, 1954) is an American sprint canoer who competed in the mid-1980s. At the 1984 Summer Olympics in Los Angeles, she finished fourth in the K-4 500 m event and fifth in the K-2 500 m event.

Klein attended Middlebury College as a member of the class of 1978.

References

Sports-Reference.com profile

1954 births
American female canoeists
Canoeists at the 1984 Summer Olympics
Living people
Olympic canoeists of the United States
Middlebury College alumni
21st-century American women